Olivier de Berranger (10 November 1938 – 23 May 2017) was a Roman Catholic bishop.

Ordained to the priesthood in 1964, de Berranger served as bishop of the Roman Catholic Diocese of Saint-Denis, France from 1996 until 2009.

References

1938 births
2017 deaths
21st-century French Roman Catholic bishops
20th-century French Roman Catholic bishops